Albert III, Prince of Anhalt-Zerbst (died ca. 1 August 1359) was a German prince of the House of Ascania and ruler of the principality of Anhalt-Zerbst. He was the eldest son of Albert II, Prince of Anhalt-Zerbst, by his second wife Beatrix, daughter of Rudolf I, Elector of Saxony and Duke of Saxe-Wittemberg.

Life
During the life of his father, Albert was made co-ruler of the principality of Anhalt-Zerbst; at the same time, his uncle Waldemar I was also co-ruler with his residence at Dessau. His reign apparently lasted only a few months, and he predeceased his father and uncle. His next brother Rudolf was ordained a priest, thus his father's heir and eventual successor was his youngest brother John II.

Princes of Anhalt-Zerbst
1359 deaths
Year of birth unknown